The Boomalli Aboriginal Artists Cooperative was founded in 1987 in the Sydney suburb of Redfern, New South Wales. Among the legacies of the cooperative are the Deadly Awards for achievement in the Indigenous Australian community, which have occurred annually from 1995 to the present. The 20th anniversary of the cooperative was celebrated in 2007 with an exhibition at the Art Gallery of NSW. 

The founding members of the cooperative are Michael Riley (1960–2004), Avril Quaill, Tracey Moffatt, Fiona Foley, Brenda L Croft, Jeffrey Samuels, Euphemia Bostock, Fern Martins, Bronwyn Bancroft and Arone Meeks.

History 
Boomalli has its roots in the National Black Theatre, which operated in Redfern in the 1970s and was part of "an explosion of pride and public confidence" in Aboriginal culture and organisations.

The urban Aboriginal art movement was given attention in 1984 with an exhibition in Woolloomooloo, a suburb of  Sydney. This was followed by a 1986 exhibition. A number of critics gave negative comments and called urban Aboriginal art "a passing fad".

The ten artists who founded the cooperative were diverse in their art practices but together were seeking a way to be accepted in mainstream art. They have supported many Aboriginal and Torres Strait Islander artists through their gallery, which is now in the Sydney suburb of Leichhardt. Their primary objective is to support artists from Aboriginal language groups in the state of New South Wales.

The word boomalli means "make a mark" in at least three Aboriginal languages: Bandjalung, Kamilaroi/Gamilaraay and Wiradjuri.

The launch of the cooperative in 1987 was made possible by photographer Michael Riley and activist Gary Foley, who was a director of the Aboriginal Arts Board and helped to get funding from the Board. But it was not smooth sailing.  They were unable to achieve a permanent home and have had to move the cooperative gallery four times. Government ministers did not respond to requests, and the Australian Taxation Office listed a major debt.  With help from pro-bono lawyers the Cooperative was able to resolve their obligations and achieve legal rights to their current location.

By 2012 the cooperative was being run professionally, with financial management, governance, and marketing.  While the Leichhardt council is supportive, the Cooperative has received no funding or support from state of Federal government.

The Artists 
The urban Aboriginal art movement presented strong political messages about the history and treatment of Aboriginal Australians, and their treatment in the 1980s.

In the 1990s the popularity of Aboriginal Art was booming nationally and overseas, as the Cooperative built relationships with major Australian and International galleries. 

Today the cooperative includes and actively supports 50 Aboriginal artists many of whom are young emerging artists.  Many of these members have had enduring and successful careers.

The Cooperative presents exhibitions each year, and small galleries at the front of their Leichhardt location allow individual artists to self-curate small exhibitions.

They also provide a shop of Aboriginal artists' work both in-gallery and online.

References

External links
Official website
Boomalli at Redfern Oral History

1987 establishments in Australia
Art galleries established in 1987
Indigenous Australian mass media
Artist cooperatives
Culture of Sydney
Cooperatives in Australia

Australian women artists